A Touch of Cloth is a British television comedy series created and written by Charlie Brooker and Daniel Maier, shown on Sky One. A parody of British police procedural dramas, it stars John Hannah as Jack Cloth, a police detective with personal problems, and Suranne Jones as Anne Oldman, his colleague. The title is a play on the title of the detective series A Touch of Frost and the British euphemism "touching cloth". The DVD of the first series was released in the UK on 3 September 2012, and the second and third series were released on 1 September 2014.

Cast
 John Hannah as D.I. Jack Cloth 
 Suranne Jones as D.C/D.I. Anne Oldman 
 Julian Rhind-Tutt as A.C.C. Tom Boss 
 Navin Chowdhry as D.C. Asap Qureshi 
 Adrian Bower as D.S. Des Hairihan 
 Daisy Beaumont as Dr. Natasha Sachet 
 Todd Carty as D.C. Todd Carty (Series 1–2)
 Karen Gillan as D.C. Kerry Newblood (Series 3)

Series overview

Episodes

Series 1 (2012)
Guest stars in this series include Raquel Cassidy as Claire Hawkchurch; Theo Barklem-Biggs as Darren Crossway; Brian Cox as Bill Ball and Kate Fleetwood as Kate Cloth.

Series 2 (2013)
Guest stars in this series include Anna Chancellor as Hope Goodgirl; Stephen Dillane as Macratty; Gwyneth Powell as Mrs McClusky; and guest appearances from Graham Cole, Peter Dean, Konnie Huq, Rufus Hound and Richard Osman.

Series 3 (2014)
Guest stars in this series include Jessie Morell as Ivy Branch and Adrian Dunbar as Damien Vull.

Series 4
A joke trailer for the fourth series ended the last episode of series three.

John Hannah claimed, in 2015, that the series has been cancelled. "I imagine that's dead. I think it's been too long. I loved that show. Charlie wanted to do more, everyone did. It was Sky I guess. There might have been something to do with the negotiations, I don't know. We did the first one, then they wanted a lot more and Charlie wasn't sure he could sustain it over twelve episodes. So we did two more and then by the third one, they had figured out what they were doing. I think it's dead, it's a couple of years since we did that now. Normally when these things go, they go pretty quickly because people have other commitments, and Charlie is busy. It's a real shame. I doubt I'll be playing DI McDoodah for the next few years!"

Critical reception
A Touch of Cloth received mixed reviews. In its review of the first series, The Guardian wrote that the show is "stuffed to the rafters with jokes", noting the variety of both good and bad jokes. Radio Times also commented on the hit-and-miss nature of the show: "while a lot of [the jokes] don’t stick ... when it’s funny, it’s deliriously so."

Series 2 received a similar critical response, with Time Out giving 3 out of 5 stars to the first episode and 2 out of 5 stars to the second episode. Again the show was both criticised and praised for its relentless jokes, with one critic calling the second series "black-hole dense with good gags" and noting that "there may be nothing quite so brilliant on British TV this year", but saying he "couldn't wait for the experience to end", observing Brooker's use of "cop drama clichés" to "strangle [the viewer] with unremitting genius."

See also
 Police Squad!, a similar American TV series from the 1980s that spawned the Naked Gun film series.
 Angie Tribeca, a similar American TV series that satirises American procedurals.
 Sledge Hammer!, a sustained satire of Dirty Harry and other action heroes.

References

External links

 
 
 

2012 British television series debuts
2014 British television series endings
2010s British black comedy television series
2010s British crime comedy television series
2010s British police procedural television series
2010s British police comedy television series
British detective television series
British parody television series
English-language television shows
Murder in television
Sky UK original programming
Television series created by Charlie Brooker
Television series by Banijay
Television series by Zeppotron
Television shows set in London